is a 2012 Japanese drama film directed by Yoshiyuki Yoshimura. It is based on the 2008 novel  by Eiichi Ikegami.

Cast
 Yukie Nakama
 Shōsuke Tanihara
 Takashi Tsukamoto
 Gackt

References

External links
  
 

2012 3D films
2012 drama films
2012 films
Films based on Japanese novels
Japanese 3D films
Japanese drama films
2010s Japanese films